In the entertainment industry, a one sheet (or one-sheet) is a single document that summarizes a product for publicity and sales.

Cinema 
A one sheet is a specific size (typically  before 1985;  after 1985) of film poster advertising. Multiple one-sheets are used to assemble larger advertisements, which are referred to by their sheet count, including 24-sheet billboards, and 30-sheet billboards. The term is also used as synonym for the poster artwork and the film poster itself.
Since a one sheet is used in the official advertising for a film, they are prized by both collectors of memorabilia for specific films and of film posters themselves. Film posters sold in general retail are in poster size, . Prior to 1985, the majority of film posters sent to cinemas were folded before mailing, although, on rare occasions, they were instead rolled and shipped in tubes. While today there are several ways to eliminate these fold lines, many purists prefer film posters in their used conditions.

Music 
In music publicity and distribution, a one sheet is exactly what the name implies:  one sheet of paper, on which information is provided about the musician and/or a specific release which is being distributed.  One sheets often accompany a record or CD when it is being shipped to radio stations and music publications (i.e., magazines, web-based forums, etc.)  A one sheet is sometimes also referred to as a press sheet or a promo sheet.

Layout and content 
Depending on the purpose it serves, a one sheet will often contain a variety of information about its subject. Often comprising both images and text, one sheets typically serve as a way to introduce the unfamiliar reader to a particular artist.  The name of the artist (and perhaps the title of the release) will appear prominently. Some common elements found on a one-sheet can include:
 Logo
 Biographical information
 Photograph(s) of the artist
 Cover artwork for the release
 Names of the stronger, more representative tracks
 Names of tracks that might be in violation of U.S. Federal Communications Commission (FCC) guidelines (for radio airplay)
 List of similar artists
 Contact information for the artist, record label, or distributor
 Planned retail release date

See also
Fact sheet

References

Further reading
 Discussion of one sheets from an educational website.

Advertising
Entertainment industry